The Parallel mixed team competition of the alpine skiing events at the 2012 Winter Youth Olympics in Innsbruck, Austria, was held on January 18, at Patscherkofel. 8 teams different countries took part in this event.

Nations

Bracket
The race started at 11:15.

References

Alpine skiing at the 2012 Winter Youth Olympics